Parametric may refer to:

Mathematics 
Parametric equation, a representation of a curve through equations, as functions of a variable
Parametric statistics, a branch of statistics that assumes data has come from a type of probability distribution
Parametric derivative, a type of derivative in calculus
Parametric model, a family of distributions that can be described using a finite number of parameters
Parametric oscillator, a harmonic oscillator whose parameters oscillate in time
Parametric surface, a particular type of surface in the Euclidean space R3
Parametric family, a family of objects whose definitions depend on a set of parameters

Science 
Parametric process, in optical physics, any process in which an interaction between light and matter does not change the state of the material
Spontaneous parametric down-conversion, in quantum optics, a source of entangled photon pairs and of single photons
Optical parametric amplifier, a type of laser light source that emits light of variable wavelengths
Statistical parametric mapping, a statistical technique for examining differences in brain activity recorded during functional neuroimaging
Parametric search

Financial services 
Parametric contract, a financial or investment contract
Parametric insurance, insurance that agrees to make a payment upon the occurrence of a triggering event
Parametric feature based modeler, a modeler using features defined to be parametric shapes associated with attributes

Computing 
Parametric polymorphism, a feature of some type systems in computer programming
Parametric animation, a computer-animation technique
Parametric Technology Corporation, an American technology company
Software parametric models, a set of related mathematical equations that incorporates variable parameters

Other uses 
Parametric feature based modeler, a modeler using features defined to be parametric shapes associated with attributes
Parametric determinism, a Marxist interpretation of the course of history
Parametric equalizer, a multi-band variable equalizer
Parametric array, a nonlinear transduction mechanism
Parametric design, a design process

See also 
Parameter (disambiguation)